Troublesome Creek is a stream in the U.S. state of Georgia. It is a tributary to the Towaliga River.

Troublesome Creek is a name indicative of rugged terrain.

References

Rivers of Georgia (U.S. state)
Rivers of Spalding County, Georgia